Mannville is a village in central Alberta, Canada. Its primary industry is agriculture.

History 

The settlement was named for Sir Donald Mann, vice-president of the Canadian Northern Railway.

The Mannville Group, an oil and gas bearing unit of the Western Canadian Sedimentary Basin, was named for the village by A.W. Nauss in 1945.

Demographics 

In the 2016 Census of Population conducted by Statistics Canada, the Village of Mannville recorded a population of 828 living in 341 of its 377 total private dwellings, a  change from its 2011 population of 803.

Notable people 
Frances Bay: actress
Vernon Booher: mass murderer
Kyle Calder: professional hockey player
Peter Gadsden: Lord Mayor of London
Erving Goffman: sociologist
Mike Rathje: professional hockey player
Miles Zaharko: professional hockey player

See also 
List of communities in Alberta
List of villages in Alberta

References

External links 

1906 establishments in Alberta
County of Minburn No. 27
Villages in Alberta